Jennie Kidd Trout (born Gowanlock; April 21, 1841 – November 10, 1921) was the first woman in Canada to become a licensed medical doctor, on March 11, 1875. Trout was the only woman in Canada licensed to practice medicine until July 1880, when Emily Stowe completed the official qualifications.  Although the Inspector General of Hospitals in Upper and Lower Canada from 1857-59, Dr James Barry, was born Margaret Anne Bulkley in Ireland around 1789, Barry practiced medicine (whether out of practical need, or gender identity as either intersex or transgender) as a man.

Biography 
Born in Wooden Mills, Kelso, Scotland, Jennie (whose name is variously spelled 'Jenny') moved with her parents to Canada in 1847, settling near Stratford, Ontario. Trout had taken a course in teaching after graduation, and had taught until her marriage to Edward Trout.  She married Trout in 1865 and thereafter moved to Toronto, where Edward ran a newspaper.

Motivated by her own chronic illnesses, she decided on a medical career, passing her matriculation exam in 1871 and studying medicine at the University of Toronto. Trout and Emily Jennings Stowe were together the first women admitted to the Toronto School of Medicine, by special arrangement. Stowe, however, refused to sit her exams in protest of the school's demeaning treatment of the two women. Trout later transferred to the Woman's Medical College of Pennsylvania, where she earned her M.D. on March 11, 1875 and became the first licensed female physician in Canada.

Trout then opened the Therapeutic and Electrical Institute in Toronto, which specialized in treatments for women involving "galvanic baths or electricity."  For six years, she also ran a free dispensary for the poor at the same location.  The Institute was quite successful, later opening branches in Brantford and Hamilton, Ontario.

Due to poor health, Trout retired in 1882 to Palma Sola, Florida.  She was later instrumental in the establishment of a medical school for women at Queen's University in Kingston.  Her family travelled extensively between Florida and Ontario, and later moved to Los Angeles, California, where she died in 1921.

In 1991, Canada Post issued a postage stamp in her honour to commemorate her as the first woman licensed to practise medicine in Canada.

On April 21, 2018, Google celebrated her 177th birthday with a Google Doodle.

See also
Canadian Women's Suffrage Association

References

External links
GOWANLOCK, JENNY KIDD (Trout), Dictionary of Canadian Biography Online
Historica Minute video and details, with links to lesson plans
Jennie (Jenny) Kidd Trout (The Canadian Encyclopedia)
Jennie Kidd Gowanlock Trout, biographical page from a descendant
Famous Canadian Physicians at Library and Archives Canada

1841 births
1921 deaths
20th-century Canadian physicians
19th-century Canadian physicians
Canadian women physicians
People from Perth County, Ontario
Pre-Confederation Ontario people
Scottish emigrants to pre-Confederation Ontario
People from Kelso, Scottish Borders
University of Toronto alumni
Persons of National Historic Significance (Canada)
Canadian philanthropists
Academic staff of the Queen's University at Kingston
Woman's Medical College of Pennsylvania alumni
Canadian women philanthropists
Immigrants to the Province of Canada
20th-century women physicians
19th-century women physicians
20th-century Canadian women scientists